Yu Yunwen (1110–1174) was a Chinese official and general of the Song dynasty. He fought in the Jin–Song wars and led the Song forces in the Battle of Caishi against an army of the Jurchen-led Jin dynasty.

Notes

References

Jin–Song Wars
Song dynasty generals
Song dynasty chancellors
Politicians from Meishan
Song dynasty politicians from Sichuan
Generals from Sichuan